The 1991 Peterborough City Council election took place on 2 May 1991 to elect members of Peterborough City Council in England. This was on the same day as other local elections.

Election result

References

1991
1990s in Cambridgeshire
Peterborough